StegFS is a free steganographic file system for Linux based on the ext2 filesystem. It is licensed under the GPL. It was principally developed by Andrew D. McDonald and Markus G. Kuhn.

The last version of StegFS is 1.1.4, released February 14, 2001. This is a development release, with known bugs, such as a file corruption bug. There is no stable release. The last website activity was in 2004. In 2003, Andreas C. Petter and Sebastian Urbach intended to continue development of StegFS, and created a site for it on SourceForge.net. The development has further moved to using FUSE library, and working releases are available from the development homepage.

See also

 Filesystem-level encryption
 List of cryptographic file systems

Further reading

External links
StegFS original home page
StegFS development home page
StegFS research paper -(PDF file)
StegFS SourceForge project page

Disk file systems
Free special-purpose file systems
File systems supported by the Linux kernel
Steganography